Sioux Chief PowerPEX 200 may refer to:
 Sioux Chief PowerPEX 200 (Toledo), an ARCA Menards Series race held at Toledo Speedway which had that name in 2019.
 Sioux Chief PowerPEX 200 (Memphis), an ARCA Menards Series race held at Memphis Motorsports Park which currently has that name.